Greeley County High School is a public high school in Tribune, Kansas serving Greeley County. The school mascot is the jackrabbit and the school colors are red and white. It is located at 400 West Larence Street.

Greeley County High School was authorized by the Kansas Legislature and secretary of state in 1895.

See also
List of high schools in Kansas

References

Public high schools in Kansas
Greeley County, Kansas
1895 establishments in Kansas